Regency Furniture Stadium is a 4,200-seat baseball park in Waldorf, Maryland that hosted its first regular season baseball game on May 2, 2008, as the tenants of the facility, the Southern Maryland Blue Crabs defeated the Lancaster Barnstormers, 3–2. For the 2010 baseball season, the collegiate summer Southern Maryland Nationals of the Cal Ripken, Sr. Collegiate Baseball League will play select games at the venue. The CRSCBL previously used Regency Furniture for the Mid-Atlantic Classic (see below).  With the groundbreaking for Southern Maryland's new stadium, a local company, Regency Furniture, purchased the naming rights for $2.88 million over 10 years.

Regency Furniture Stadium is capped by sloping red roofs, similar to the architecture of Churchill Downs, designed to pay homage to the Southern Maryland region's tobacco barns. The left field wall of the ballpark bears a door that allows players to enter the field from the locker room, modeled after the Green Monster at Fenway Park.

History

In 1985, Charles County initiated plans to build a ballpark for the relocated Kinston Indians of the Carolina League.  Construction workers even cleared trees to prepare the site, however, the ballpark planning eventually fell through.  After county commissioners balked on the construction, $500,000 in public funds were paid to cancel signed contracts and undo the progress made during site preparation.  The A affiliate of the Cleveland Indians remained in Kinston, and the Southern Maryland region was without a professional baseball team for another 23 years.

In 2004, a company called Opening Day Partners renewed interest for a Charles County ballpark. The stadium was originally slated to be built in the town of Hughesville, but the residents voted against it in order to maintain the "rural charm" of the area. After Hughesville residents denied the ballpark, all interest shifted to Waldorf, a bedroom community of Washington, D.C. The Atlantic League of Professional Baseball formally announced an expansion team for Waldorf on February 15, 2006, to begin play in the 2008 season. The Blue Crabs were originally supposed to be an expansion team for the 2007 season, but the construction bids for Regency Furniture Stadium came in over budget. The ballpark instead opened in 2008.

In May 2007, commissioners from Charles County approved a $19 million bid for the construction of Regency Furniture Stadium. The groundbreaking ceremony was held on July 27, 2007, with Maryland Governor Martin O'Malley in attendance and CEO of Regency Furniture.

Ballpark attractions
Regency Furniture Stadium's concession stands were previously all named after Hall of Famer and former team co-owner Brooks Robinson, featuring the MVP Grill, the Gold Glove Grill, Hall of Fame Seafood, the Hot Corner Carvery, the All-Star Pizzeria, and Five’s Fare. Among the more common ballpark fare, the menu featured several seafood-themed concessions such as the sea dog (fish on a hot dog bun), fried rockfish, crab cakes, crab balls, and the crab-filled soft pretzel. A tent-covered picnic area, formerly known as the Texas Roadhouse Corral, overlooks left field. Beer was available at the Backfin Pale Ale brewery. As the 2017 season, the stadium features a dedicated concession stand offering fair from Chickie's & Pete's, a Philadelphia-area sports bar, as well as hot dogs from Nick's of Clinton (a local provider), Domino's Pizza, Rita's Italian Ice custard cookie sandwiches, Dippin' Dots, and Pepsi products.

Children at the ballpark can enjoy Pinch's Playground, which includes a rock climbing wall and various inflatables.  Additional attractions include the Crab Shack, the Blue Crabs' souvenir store, and the Legends Club, a facility designed for business conferences or parties.

Crabby Cove
Crabby Cove is a 54,000-gallon, artificial pond with 4 paddle boats young guests can ride. Safety netting prevents incoming baseballs from injuring patrons of Crabby Cove.

Basketball Court
For the 2016 season, the team installed two basketball hoops on a court past the left-centerfield wall. Guests are encouraged to play during any home game.

Special events

Concerts

The first concert at Regency Furniture Stadium featured the rock band REO Speedwagon, who played to a crowd of over 4,000 on August 11, 2008. The ballpark also hosted a series of Southern Maryland Country Music Festival performances that included Craig Morgan, Gary Allan, John Luskey Band, Shooter Jennings, and SwampDaWamp. Trace Adkins, another notable country musician, was scheduled to perform on July 4, 2009, for a tribute to the United States Armed Forces. Hip hop artists T-Pain and Flo Rida performed on June 6, 2009. The rock band 3 Doors Down was booked for August 14, but moved when Kool Productions was offered a better deal by National Harbor with a potential of attendance up to and over 15,000. The two remaining shows for Regency Stadium were also moved to National Harbor.

Mid-Atlantic Classic

On July 15, 2009, Regency Furniture Stadium hosted the inaugural Mid-Atlantic Classic, which the Cal Ripken, Sr. Collegiate Baseball League All-Stars defeated the Valley Baseball League All-Stars, 2–1. The game was televised on MASN.

Soccer

On July 13, 2009, Regency Furniture Stadium hosted an exhibition soccer match between Crystal Palace F.C., a Football League Championship team based in London, and its U.S. affiliate, Crystal Palace Baltimore. The game was nationally televised in the United States by the Fox Soccer Channel. The English team beat the American team, 5–2.

Crabfest All American Games

In 2014 Regency Furniture Stadium hosted the second Crabfest All American Games, which is a high school and youth all-star baseball event with players from the Mid-Atlantic Region competing for spots on the CrabFest All American Teams. The game was televised on All In Broadcasting. Crabfest returned to Regency Furniture Stadium again in 2016.

Maryland Championship Wrestling Base Brawl
Regency Furniture Stadium hosted its first professional wrestling event in its history on Saturday, June 18, 2016, featuring the performers of Maryland Championship Wrestling. Headliners XPac, Billy Gunn, and Ron Simmons helped attract a large crowd for the event.

References

External links 
 Regency Furniture Stadium
 Ballpark Reviews – Regency Furniture Stadium
 3d Aerial Survey of Regency Furniture Stadium

Sports venues in Maryland
Minor league baseball venues
Atlantic League of Professional Baseball ballparks
Waldorf, Maryland
2008 establishments in Maryland
Sports venues completed in 2008